Pierre Botha (born 14 July 1975) is a South African cricketer. He played in one first-class match for Eastern Province in 1996/97.

See also
 List of Eastern Province representative cricketers

References

External links
 

1975 births
Living people
South African cricketers
Eastern Province cricketers
People from Roodepoort